Nikola Vujović (born 27 November 1990) is a Serbian football forward who last played for Javor Ivanjica.

Career
Born in Bačka Palanka, Vujović started his career in Javor Ivanjica. Later he played for Lokomotiva Beograd in two times, and OFK Mladenovac. He returned in Javor in winter break off-season 2013–14.

Career statistics

Honours
Lokomotiva Beograd
Belgrade Zone League: 2012–13

References

External links
 
 Nikola Vujović stats at utakmica.rs 
 

1990 births
Living people
People from Bačka Palanka
Association football forwards
Serbian footballers
OFK Mladenovac players
FK Javor Ivanjica players
Serbian First League players
Serbian SuperLiga players